Basin modelling is the term broadly applied to a group of geological disciplines that can be used to analyse the formation and evolution of sedimentary basins, often but not exclusively to aid evaluation of potential hydrocarbon reserves.

At its most basic, a basin modelling exercise must assess:

 The burial history of the basin (see back-stripping).
 The thermal history of the basin (see thermal history modelling).
 The maturity history of the source rocks.
 The expulsion, migration and trapping of hydrocarbons.

By doing so, valuable inferences can be made about such matters as hydrocarbon generation and timing, maturity of potential source rocks and migration paths of expelled hydrocarbons.

References
 Duppenbecker S. J. and Eliffe J. E., Basin Modelling: Practice and Progress, Geological Society Special Publication, (1998). 
 Lerche I., Basin Analysis: Quantitative Methods v.2, Academic Press (1990). 
 Hantschel, T. and Kauerauf, A.I., Fundamentals of Basin and Petroleum Systems Modeling, Springer (2009). 
 Lee, E.Y., Novotny, J., Wagreich, M., Subsidence analysis and visualization - for sedimentary basin analysis and modelling. Springer (2019).  https://www.springer.com/gp/book/9783319764238

Basin modelling software
Software packages have been designed for 1D/2D/3D basin modelling purposes to simulate the burial and thermal history of a basin as well as petroleum migration modelling.
Basin Modeling software programs:
Permedia (Halliburton), 
PBM-Pars Basin Modeler(Research Institute of Petroleum Industry), 
PetroMod (Schlumberger),
BasinMod (Platte River Associates, Inc.),
Genex,Temis 2D,3D (Beicip/IFP),
Migri, MigriX (Migris),
Sigma2D (JNOC/TRC),
Novva (Sirius Exploration Geochemistry Inc.), 
Genesis-Trinity(Zetaware),and
WinBury software.

Basin modelling publications
 Basin Modeling Publications

Sedimentology
Petroleum geology